"A Design for Life" is a single by Welsh band Manic Street Preachers from their fourth studio album, Everything Must Go (1996). Released on 15 April 1996, the song peaked and debuted at number two on the UK Singles Chart.

Origins
The title was inspired by the debut Joy Division EP, An Ideal for Living. The opening line of the song 'Libraries gave us power' was inspired by a legend engraved over the entrance to the former library in Pillgwenlly, Newport, 15 miles from the band's home town of Blackwood in Wales: 'Knowledge is Power'. The next line, 'then work came and made us free', refers to the German slogan  that featured above the gates of Nazi concentration camps and which had been used previously by the band in their song "The Intense Humming of Evil" on the album The Holy Bible.

The song explores themes of class conflict and working class identity and solidarity, inspired by the band's strong socialist convictions. Speaking in 2017, Nicky Wire explained that he "was sick to death with the patronisation of the working class. We’re not just Jeremy Kyle – we did build libraries. My dad was a miner". Its video exemplifies this theme further. Vintage advertising slogans promoting compliance and  domesticity clash with scenes of fox hunting, Royal Ascot, a polo match and the Last Night of the Proms representing what the band saw as class privilege.

The song was the first to be written and released by the band following the disappearance of figurehead Richey Edwards the previous year. Interviewed in 2014 by NME for their "Song Stories" video series, singer and guitarist James Dean Bradfield recalled that the lyric had been a fusion of two sets of lyrics — "Design for Life" and "Pure Motive" — sent to him from Wales by bassist Nicky Wire, while he was living in Shepherd's Bush. The music was written "in about ten minutes" and Bradfield felt a sense of euphoria with the result. The song was credited with having "rescued the band" from the despair felt after the disappearance of Edwards, with Wire describing the song as "a bolt of light from a severely dark place". The band approached Mike Hedges to be involved in producing the song after hearing McAlmont & Butler's string-laden single "Yes", which Hedges had worked on.

Release
The single reached number two on the UK Singles Chart on 27 April 1996 and was the first in a run of five consecutive releases to be top-10 hits. It spent a total of 14 weeks on the chart, with seven weeks in the UK top 40, being the best performing single by the band, along with "Your Love Alone Is Not Enough". It has achieved platinum status in the UK (600,000 copies). With "A Design for Life" the band also began a run of 11 years where all their singles charted within the top 20 in the UK until 2007, when "Indian Summer" from Send Away the Tigers broke the run by peaking at number 22. The song peaked at number 48 in New Zealand and at number 50 in Australia. In both countries, it only charted for one week. In Ireland, it charted in the top 20, reaching number 17.

The CD single also included the songs "Mr Carbohydrate", "Dead Passive" and "Dead Trees and Traffic Islands", while the cassette included a live version of "Bright Eyes". As part of Record Store Day 2016, 2000 copies were released on 12" vinyl in a copper sleeve.

Critical reception
British magazine Music Week rated the song five out of five, picking it as Single of the Week. They wrote, "The Manics' return is a lush but stirring epic and their most commercial single to date. Mike Hedge's production has brought a more radio-friendly sound to the band and this looks like being their biggest hit yet."

Legacy
The song is referred to in the song "Slide Show" (alongside Beck's "Devils Haircut" and Oasis' "Wonderwall") on Travis' 1999 album, The Man Who: "'Cause there is no design for life, There's no devil's haircut in my mind, There is not a wonderwall to climb or step around".

In May 2007 NME magazine placed "A Design for Life" at number 30 in its list of  "50 Greatest Indie Anthems Ever". In October 2011 NME placed it at number 75 on its list of "150 Best Tracks of the Past 15 Years".

On 18 June 2009 the band were invited to officially open the new £15m Cardiff Central Library, unveiling a plaque inscribed with the words to the opening line of the song. At the event, Wire spoke about how his experience with libraries had partly inspired the song. The Cardiff Arms Park Male Voice Choir performed a version of the song, in front of the band, which Nicky Wire described as "spine tingling".

Wire later said in an interview with The Guardian that the occasion had been a great honour for the band: "For us, it seemed like a chance to give something back to Wales. Seeing one of our lyrics – "Libraries gave us power", from A Design for Life – inscribed on the opening plaque was in its own way as affecting as playing the Millennium Stadium."

In August 2016, American music publication Spin Magazine ranked "A Design for Life" at number 31 of the "96 Best Alternative Rock Songs of 1996.

Music video
The video was directed by Pedro Romhanyi. It is particularly closely connected to the song’s theme and depicts the band playing on an indoor stage in an apparently cold industrial location. Various slogans, extolling capitalist ideals, are shown on screen or projected onto the walls and are reflected in archive footage mainly from the 1950s.

Track listings
All music was composed by James Dean Bradfield and Sean Moore; all lyrics were written by Nicky Wire except where noted.

UK CD1
 "A Design for Life"
 "Mr Carbohydrate"
 "Dead Passive"
 "Dead Trees and Traffic Islands" (music and lyric James Dean Bradfield, Sean Moore, Nicky Wire)

UK CD2
 "A Design for Life"
 "A Design for Life" (Stealth Sonic Orchestra version)
 "A Design for Life" (Stealth Sonic Orchestra instrumental version)
 "Faster" (vocal mix) (music: James Dean Bradfield, Sean Moore; lyric: Nicky Wire, Richey Edwards)

UK 7-inch jukebox single
A. "A Design for Life"
B. "Bright Eyes" (live) (Mike Batt)

UK, European, and US 12-inch single
A1. "A Design for Life"
A2. "Dead Trees and Traffic Islands"
B1. "A Design For Life" (Stealth Sonic Orchestra Remix)
B2. "Mr Carbohydrate"

Charts

Weekly charts

Year-end charts

Certifications

References

External links
 acoustic version James Dean Bradfield, August 2013 at walesonline.co.uk

Manic Street Preachers songs
1996 singles
1996 songs
Columbia Records singles
Britpop songs
Epic Records singles
Music videos directed by Pedro Romhanyi
Songs written by James Dean Bradfield
Songs written by Nicky Wire
Songs written by Sean Moore (musician)
Sony Music singles
Works about socialism